Guoliang Yu is a Chinese American mathematician. After receiving his Ph.D from SUNY at Stony Brook in 1991 
under the direction of Ronald G. Douglas, Yu spent time at the Mathematical Sciences Research Institute (1991–1992), the University of Colorado at Boulder (1992–2000), Vanderbilt University (2000–2012), and a variety of visiting positions. He currently holds the Powell Chair in Mathematics 
and was appointed University Distinguished Professor in 2018 at Texas A&M University. He is a fellow of the American Mathematical Society.

Yu's research interests include noncommutative geometry, higher index theory of elliptic operators, K-theory, and geometric group theory. He is best known for his fundamental contributions to the Novikov conjecture on homotropy invariants of higher signatures, the Baum–Connes conjecture on K-theory of group C*-algebras, and the stable Borel conjecture on rigidity of manifolds. In his work on the Novikov conjecture, he developed controlled operator K-theory. In the mathematical literature, several concepts are named after him, including Yu's property A and Yu's localization algebra.

Yu has delivered invited addresses at the American Mathematical Society meeting in 1999, and at the International Congress of Mathematicians in Madrid in 2006. He was a plenary speaker at the Topology Festival  in 2002 and the Geometry Festival in 2007. He is an editor of the Journal of Noncommutative Geometry, the Annals of K-Theory, the Journal of Topology and Analysis, and the Kyoto Journal of Mathematics.

Books
Large Scale Geometry (with Piotr Nowak), EMS Textbooks in Mathematics. European Mathematical Society (EMS), Zürich, 2012. xiv+189 pp. .

References

20th-century American mathematicians
Living people
Chinese mathematicians
Stony Brook University alumni
Fellows of the American Mathematical Society
American people of Chinese descent
21st-century American mathematicians
1963 births